Wobble Palace is a 2018 film directed by Eugene Kotlyarenko.

Plot
A couple in Los Angeles decides to spend alternate days of Halloween weekend 2016 in the house they share as their mutual interest in their relationship wanes.

Cast

Reception
Reviews of the film were mostly positive. In the New York Times, critic Teo Bugbee praised the film as "[...] a sendup of broke-artist types that shimmers with abashed affection". A review on The Playlist by Lena Wilson echoed this sentiment, writing that it: "[...] perfectly reproduces a subculture, both visually and narratively". RogerEbert.com highlighted Jane's portion of the narrative, saying the film "[...] picks up and flies" when focused on her.

Michael Zelenko, writing for The Verge, praised the film's depiction of the characters' relationship with their cell phones.

References

External links
 

Films set in Los Angeles
2018 films
2018 drama films
American drama films
2010s English-language films
2010s American films